Sylvester "Earl" Powell (born February 23, 1972) most commonly known as Earl Powell, is an American songwriter and record producer. He is the owner of Eptone Music Productions. He produced and co-wrote Jennifer Hudson's  song "Stand Up" and co-wrote several songs on Tito Jackson's solo project.

Credits/Discography

Songs 
 Keyshia Cole Woman To Woman featuring Ashanti ( Woman To Woman - 2012) Producer
 Syleena Johnson Angry Girl (Chapter V: Underrated - 2011) Producer
 Syleena Johnson Champ (Chapter V: Underrated - 2011) ProducerChapter V: Underrated - 2011) Producer
 Syleena Johnson Like Thorns (Chapter V: Underrated - 2011) ProducerChapter V: Underrated - 2011) Producer
 Floyd Taylor All Of You All Of Me (All Of Me - 2010) Producer
 Jennifer Hudson Stand Up (Jennifer Hudson [ Target US, iTunes Japan and UK Versions] - 2008) Producer
 Floyd Taylor What If He Knew (You Still Got It - 2007) Producer
 Floyd Taylor Woman (You Still Got It - 2007) Producer
 Floyd Taylor You Still Got It (You Still Got It - 2007) Producer
 Floyd Taylor If You Catch Me Sleepin (You Still Got It - 2007) Producer
 Strong All I Need (Strong - 1999) Producer
 Strong Frontin (Strong - 1999) Producer
 Strong How Would You Feel (Strong - 1999) Producer
 Strong I Can’t Hide (Strong - 1999) Producer
 Strong I Got What You Need (Strong - 1999) Producer
 Strong I Know (Strong - 1999) Producer
 Strong Lucky Star (Strong - 1999) Producer
 Strong Mi Amiga (Strong - 1999) Producer
 Strong Ready Or Not (Strong - 1999) Producer
 Strong See You Again (Strong - 1999) Producer
 Strong Somethin (Strong - 1999) Producer
 Strong Why Would She Call (Strong - 1999) Producer
 Dejah Changes (Dejah - 1998) Producer
 Dejah Gotta Be Real (Dejah - 1998) Producer
 Dejah Krazy (Dejah - 1998) Producer
 Dejah Say It Ain’t So (Dejah - 1998) Producer
 Dejah Foolin Around (Dejah - 1998) Producer
 Entourage Baby I’m Lonely (Fall Backs Of A Playa - 1998) Producer
 Entourage Come Back Home (Fall Backs Of A Playa - 1998) Producer
 Entourage Don’t Stop This Feeling (Fall Backs Of A Playa - 1998) Producer
 Entourage Here With Me (Fall Backs Of A Playa - 1998) Producer
 Entourage Making Love (Fall Backs Of A Playa - 1998) Producer
 Entourage When (Fall Backs Of A Playa - 1998) Producer
 Entourage Why Did You (Fall Backs Of A Playa - 1998) Producer

Albums 
 Strong (Mi Amiga [CD5 / Cassette Single] - 1999) Producer
 Strong (Strong - 1999) Producer, Engineer, Vocal Arrangement, Narrator, Trumpet
 Alfonzo Hunter (Blacka Da Berry - 1996) Engineer
 Johnny P. (Next - 1998) Programming, Associate Producer
 Entourage (Fall Backs of a Playa - 1998) Producer, Vocal Arrangement, Drum Programming, Engineer, Keyboard Programming
 Entourage (Page Me Remix - 1998) Producer, Engineer, Remixing, Drum Programming, Keyboard Programming
 Dejah (Dejah - 1998) Vocal Arrangement, Engineer, Producer, Keyboard Programming

TV and film 
 ''(Mis)Leading Man'' ''(Best Short Film in Hollywood)'' – Composer ''Nothing like the Holidays'' (Debra Messing, John Leguizamo) – Composer
 ''The Truth (II)'' Hill Harper ''(CSI New York)'' directorial debut – Composer
 ''Of Boys And Men'' (Angela Bassett, Robert Townsend) – Composer

References 

1972 births
Living people
Record producers from Illinois
Singer-songwriters from Illinois
American lyricists
21st-century American singers